Lorenzo Asensio Otaduy Avendaño (1539 – 4 December 1611) was a Roman Catholic prelate who served as Bishop of Ávila (1599–1611) and Bishop of Lugo (1591–1599).

Biography
Lorenzo Asensio Otaduy Avendaño was born in Oñate, Spain in 1539.
On 4 November 1591, he was appointed during the papacy of Pope Innocent IX as Bishop of Lugo. 
On 16 February 1592, he was consecrated bishop by Juan Fernández Vadillo, Bishop of Cuenca.  
On 1 February 1599, he was appointed during the papacy of Pope Clement VIII as Bishop of Ávila. 
He served as Bishop of Ávila until his death on 4 December 1611.

References

External links and additional sources
 (for Chronology of Bishops) 
 (for Chronology of Bishops) 
 (for Chronology of Bishops) 
 (for Chronology of Bishops) 

16th-century Roman Catholic bishops in Spain
17th-century Roman Catholic bishops in Spain
Bishops appointed by Pope Innocent IX
Bishops appointed by Pope Clement VIII
1539 births
1611 deaths